The Sinaloa River is a river of Mexico. It runs across the state of Sinaloa from northeast to southwest, beginning in the Sierra Madre Occidental and emptying into the Gulf of California. Its flow is interrupted mostly by the Bacurato Dam which created Lake Baccarac in 1978. Below the dam, the flow of the river is largely diverted by an irrigation canal near the town of Sinaloa de Leyva.

See also
List of longest rivers of Mexico
List of rivers of Mexico

References
 1975 Atlas of Mexico — River basins of Mexico
The Prentice Hall American World Atlas, 1984.
Rand McNally, The New International Atlas, 1993.

Rivers of Sinaloa
Rivers of the Gulf of California
Rivers of the Sierra Madre Occidental
Rivers of Mexico